Matthew O. McHugh (January 22, 1894 – February 22, 1971) was an American film actor who appeared in more than 200 films between 1931 and 1955, primarily in small cameo parts.

Career
McHugh came from a theatrical family. His parents ran a stock theatre company and, as a young child, he performed on stage. His brother, Frank, who went on to become part of the Warner Bros. stock company in the 1930s and 1940s, and sister Kitty performed an act with him by the time he was fourteen years old, but the family quit the stage around 1930.  His brother Ed became an agent in New York. 

McHugh made his Broadway debut in Elmer Rice's Street Scene in 1929, along with his brother Ed, and also appeared in Swing Your Lady in 1936.

Despite his actual origins, McHugh usually performed his roles with a Brooklyn accent, and was often cast as characters explicitly from Brooklyn. In Star Spangled Rhythm (1941), his one scene is a protracted monologue during the climactic "Old Glory" sequence, in which McHugh plays a character who literally embodies the spirit of Brooklyn.

Partial filmography

 Street Scene (1931) as Vincent Jones
 Woman from Monte Carlo (1932) as Chief Petty Officer Vincent
 Freaks (1932) as One of the Rollo Brothers
 The Loud Mouth (1932) as Loud Mouth
 Hypnotized (1932) as Drummer
 The Devil's Brother (1933) as Francesco
 Bed of Roses (1933) as "Jones"
 The Last Trail (1933) as Looney McGann
 The Mad Game (1933) as McGee
 The Prizefighter and the Lady (1933) as Bar Patron
 Lost in the Stratosphere (1934) as Matt O'Toole
 She Loves Me Not (1934) as Andy
 The Cat's-Paw (1934) as Taxi Driver
 Wings in the Dark (1935)
 Ladies Crave Excitement (1935)
 Party Wire (1935) as Bert West
 If You Could Only Cook (1935) as Pete
 Mannequin (1937)
 The Big Broadcast of 1937 (1937) as a Cafe diner (uncredited)
 The Mad Miss Manton (1938) as Driscoll "from Headquarters"
 Mr. Smith Goes to Washington (1939) (uncredited)
 The Boys from Syracuse (1940)
 The Wild Man of Borneo (1941) as Buggy Driver
 Don't Talk (1942, Short) as Plant Employee
 A Gentleman at Heart (1942)
 Sappy Birthday (1942)
 San Diego, I Love You (1944)
 Vacation in Reno (1945)
 Pardon My Clutch (1948)
 Bodyhold (1949)
 Wham Bam Slam (1955)

References

External links

1894 births
1971 deaths
Male actors from Pennsylvania
American male film actors
People from Connellsville, Pennsylvania
20th-century American male actors